Taq may refer to:
 Taq, Iran, a village in Semnan Province, Iran
 Taq polymerase, a heat-stable enzyme used in polymerase chain reaction, or Thermus aquaticus, the species of bacteria from which the polymerase is naturally derived
 The artist Taku Sakakibara, better known as TaQ
 Trade and Quote (TAQ), databases on the New York Stock Exchange and NASDAQ
 The African Queen (film)
 Terminus ante quem, the latest possible date for a specific event